The 1989–90 NBA season was the Pacers' 14th season in the National Basketball Association, and 23rd season as a franchise. The Pacers had the seventh pick in the 1989 NBA draft, and selected George McCloud out of Florida State. The Pacers would jump out of the gate fast winning their first four games, on their way to a solid 19–9 start. However, they struggled losing 14 of their next 18 games, and held a 25–23 record at the All-Star break. The Pacers played around .500 for the remainder of the season, finishing fourth in the Central Division with a 42–40 record, and entering the playoffs as the #8 seed in the Eastern Conference.

Reggie Miller had a breakout season leading the team in scoring averaging 24.6 points per game, while becoming the first Pacer in 13 years to play in the All-Star Game, being selected for the 1990 NBA All-Star Game. In addition, Chuck Person averaged 19.7 points and 5.8 rebounds per game, while sixth man Detlef Schrempf provided the team with 16.2 points and 7.9 rebounds per game off the bench, second-year star Rik Smits provided with 15.5 points, 6.2 rebounds and 2.1 blocks per game, and Vern Fleming contributed 14.3 points and 7.4 assists per game. Miller also finished in second place in Most Improved Player voting, while Schrempf finished in second place in Sixth Man of the Year voting.

However, in the Eastern Conference First Round of the playoffs, the Pacers were swept by the defending and eventual champion Detroit Pistons in three straight games. The Pistons would go on to defeat the Portland Trail Blazers in five games in the NBA Finals, winning their second consecutive championship.

Draft picks

Roster

Regular season

Season standings

z - clinched division title
y - clinched division title
x - clinched playoff spot

Record vs. opponents

Game log

Regular season

|- align="center" bgcolor="#ccffcc"
| 1
| November 3, 1989
| @ Atlanta
| W 126–103
|
|
|
| The Omni
| 1–0
|- align="center" bgcolor="#ccffcc"
| 2
| November 4, 1989
| Cleveland
| W 106–98
|
|
|
| Market Square Arena
| 2–0
|- align="center" bgcolor="#ccffcc"
| 3
| November 8, 1989
| Detroit
| W 95–74
|
|
|
| Market Square Arena
| 3–0
|- align="center" bgcolor="#ccffcc"
| 4
| November 10, 1989
| Miami
| W 102–98
|
|
|
| Market Square Arena
| 4–0
|- align="center" bgcolor="#ffcccc"
| 5
| November 15, 1989
| @ L.A. Lakers
| L 94–117
|
|
|
| Great Western Forum
| 4–1
|- align="center" bgcolor="#ffcccc"
| 6
| November 17, 1989
| @ Utah
| L 100–114
|
|
|
| Salt Palace
| 4–2
|- align="center" bgcolor="#ffcccc"
| 7
| November 18, 1989
| @ Sacramento
| L 102–107
|
|
|
| ARCO Arena
| 4–3
|- align="center" bgcolor="#ccffcc"
| 8
| November 21, 1989
| Boston
| W 119–111
|
|
|
| Market Square Arena
| 5–3
|- align="center" bgcolor="#ccffcc"
| 9
| November 24, 1989
| @ Boston
| W 118–111
|
|
|
| Boston Garden
| 6–3
|- align="center" bgcolor="#ffcccc"
| 10
| November 25, 1989
| Philadelphia
| L 103–111
|
|
|
| Market Square Arena
| 6–4
|- align="center" bgcolor="#ccffcc"
| 11
| November 27, 1989
| @ Milwaukee
| W 101–97
|
|
|
| Bradley Center
| 7–4
|- align="center" bgcolor="#ccffcc"
| 12
| November 29, 1989
| Utah
| W 100–88
|
|
|
| Market Square Arena
| 8–4

|- align="center" bgcolor="#ccffcc"
| 13
| December 1, 1989
| Orlando
| W 125–110
|
|
|
| Market Square Arena
| 9–4
|- align="center" bgcolor="#ccffcc"
| 14
| December 6, 1989
| Denver
| W 136–117
|
|
|
| Market Square Arena
| 10–4
|- align="center" bgcolor="#ccffcc"
| 15
| December 8, 1989
| Chicago
| W 106–104
|
|
|
| Market Square Arena
| 11–4
|- align="center" bgcolor="#ffcccc"
| 16
| December 9, 1989
| @ Detroit
| L 93–121
|
|
|
| The Palace of Auburn Hills
| 11–5
|- align="center" bgcolor="#ccffcc"
| 17
| December 12, 1989
| Minnesota
| W 113–112 (OT)
|
|
|
| Market Square Arena
| 12–5
|- align="center" bgcolor="#ccffcc"
| 18
| December 14, 1989
| @ New Jersey
| W 102–78
|
|
|
| Brendan Byrne Arena
| 13–5
|- align="center" bgcolor="#ffcccc"
| 19
| December 15, 1989
| Milwaukee
| L 98–103
|
|
|
| Market Square Arena
| 13–6
|- align="center" bgcolor="#ffcccc"
| 20
| December 17, 1989
| @ Portland
| L 113–121
|
|
|
| Memorial Coliseum
| 13–7
|- align="center" bgcolor="#ffcccc"
| 21
| December 19, 1989
| @ L.A. Clippers
| L 102–128
|
|
|
| Los Angeles Memorial Sports Arena
| 13–8
|- align="center" bgcolor="#ccffcc"
| 22
| December 20, 1989
| @ Phoenix
| W 131–130 (OT)
|
|
|
| Arizona Veterans Memorial Coliseum
| 14–8
|- align="center" bgcolor="#ffcccc"
| 23
| December 22, 1989
| @ Golden State
| L 124–150
|
|
|
| Oakland-Alameda County Coliseum Arena
| 14–9
|- align="center" bgcolor="#ccffcc"
| 24
| December 23, 1989
| @ Seattle
| W 98–95
|
|
|
| Seattle Center Coliseum
| 15–9
|- align="center" bgcolor="#ccffcc"
| 25
| December 26, 1989
| Orlando
| W 98–90
|
|
|
| Market Square Arena
| 16–9
|- align="center" bgcolor="#ccffcc"
| 26
| December 27, 1989
| @ Orlando
| W 106–101
|
|
|
| Orlando Arena
| 17–9
|- align="center" bgcolor="#ccffcc"
| 27
| December 29, 1989
| Houston
| W 103–97
|
|
|
| Market Square Arena
| 18–9
|- align="center" bgcolor="#ccffcc"
| 28
| December 30, 1989
| Atlanta
| W 105–98
|
|
|
| Market Square Arena
| 19–9

|- align="center" bgcolor="#ffcccc"
| 29
| January 2, 1990
| @ Dallas
| L 106–110
|
|
|
| Reunion Arena
| 19–10
|- align="center" bgcolor="#ccffcc"
| 30
| January 3, 1990
| @ Houston
| L 103–117
|
|
|
| The Summit
| 19–11
|- align="center" bgcolor="#ffcccc"
| 31
| January 5, 1990
| @ Detroit
| L 99–122
|
|
|
| The Palace of Auburn Hills
| 19–12
|- align="center" bgcolor="#ffcccc"
| 32
| January 6, 1990
| @ Charlotte
| L 111–117
|
|
|
| Charlotte Coliseum
| 19–13
|- align="center" bgcolor="#ffcccc"
| 33
| January 8, 1990
| @ Philadelphia
| L 116–120
|
|
|
| The Spectrum
| 19–14
|- align="center" bgcolor="#ccffcc"
| 34
| January 10, 1990
| Chicago
| W 120–113
|
|
|
| Market Square Arena
| 20–14
|- align="center" bgcolor="#ffcccc"
| 35
| January 12, 1990
| New York
| L 96–101 (OT)
|
|
|
| Market Square Arena
| 20–15
|- align="center" bgcolor="#ccffcc"
| 36
| January 13, 1990
| Milwaukee
| W 111–109
|
|
|
| Market Square Arena
| 21–15
|- align="center" bgcolor="#ccffcc"
| 37
| January 15, 1990
| Golden State
| W 144–105
|
|
|
| Market Square Arena
| 22–15
|- align="center" bgcolor="#ffcccc"
| 38
| January 17, 1990
| @ Miami
| L 111–121
|
|
|
| Miami Arena
| 22–16
|- align="center" bgcolor="#ffcccc"
| 39
| January 19, 1990
| @ Boston
| L 104–109
|
|
|
| Boston Garden
| 22–17
|- align="center" bgcolor="#ffcccc"
| 40
| January 24, 1990
| L.A. Lakers
| L 111–120
|
|
|
| Market Square Arena
| 22–18
|- align="center" bgcolor="#ccffcc"
| 41
| January 26, 1990
| Miami
| W 115–105
|
|
|
| Market Square Arena
| 23–18
|- align="center" bgcolor="#ffcccc"
| 42
| January 27, 1990
| Cleveland
| L 84–91
|
|
|
| Market Square Arena
| 23–19
|- align="center" bgcolor="#ffcccc"
| 43
| January 30, 1990
| @ Orlando
| L 111–129
|
|
|
| Orlando Arena
| 23–20
|- align="center" bgcolor="#ffcccc"
| 44
| January 31, 1990
| Philadelphia
| L 108–112
|
|
|
| Market Square Arena
| 23–21

|- align="center" bgcolor="#ffcccc"
| 45
| February 2, 1990
| Seattle
| L 86–87
|
|
|
| Market Square Arena
| 23–22
|- align="center" bgcolor="#ffcccc"
| 46
| February 3, 1990
| @ New York
| L 98–112
|
|
|
| Madison Square Garden
| 23–23
|- align="center" bgcolor="#ccffcc"
| 47
| February 6, 1990
| @ Denver
| W 138–130 (OT)
|
|
|
| McNichols Sports Arena
| 24–23
|- align="center" bgcolor="#ccffcc"
| 48
| February 8, 1990
| @ San Antonio
| W 105–100
|
|
|
| HemisFair Arena
| 25–23
|- align="center"
|colspan="9" bgcolor="#bbcaff"|All-Star Break
|- style="background:#cfc;"
|- bgcolor="#bbffbb"
|- align="center" bgcolor="#ccffcc"
| 49
| February 13, 1990
| Charlotte
| W 128–105
|
|
|
| Market Square Arena
| 26–23
|- align="center" bgcolor="#ccffcc"
| 50
| February 14, 1990
| @ Cleveland
| W 133–131 (OT)
|
|
|
| Richfield Coliseum
| 27–23
|- align="center" bgcolor="#ffcccc"
| 51
| February 16, 1990
| @ Minnesota
| L 105–111
|
|
|
| Hubert H. Humphrey Metrodome
| 27–24
|- align="center" bgcolor="#ffcccc"
| 52
| February 18, 1990
| @ Washington
| L 97–116
|
|
|
| Baltimore Arena
| 27–25
|- align="center" bgcolor="#ccffcc"
| 53
| February 21, 1990
| Atlanta
| W 123–96
|
|
|
| Market Square Arena
| 28–25
|- align="center" bgcolor="#ffcccc"
| 54
| February 23, 1990
| Dallas
| L 91–102
|
|
|
| Market Square Arena
| 28–26
|- align="center" bgcolor="#ccffcc"
| 55
| February 25, 1990
| Portland
| W 117–112
|
|
|
| Market Square Arena
| 29–26
|- align="center" bgcolor="#ccffcc"
| 56
| February 27, 1990
| New Jersey
| W 118–113
|
|
|
| Market Square Arena
| 30–26
|- align="center" bgcolor="#ffcccc"
| 57
| February 28, 1990
| @ Atlanta
| L 99–102
|
|
|
| The Omni
| 30–27

|- align="center" bgcolor="#ffcccc"
| 58
| March 3, 1990
| L.A. Clippers
| L 105–107
|
|
|
| Market Square Arena
| 30–28
|- align="center" bgcolor="#ffcccc"
| 59
| March 4, 1990
| @ Detroit
| L 105–111
|
|
|
| The Palace of Auburn Hills
| 30–29
|- align="center" bgcolor="#ccffcc"
| 60
| March 6, 1990
| Washington
| W 113–98
|
|
|
| Market Square Arena
| 31–29
|- align="center" bgcolor="#ffcccc"
| 61
| March 9, 1990
| Phoenix
| L 130–134
|
|
|
| Market Square Arena
| 31–30
|- align="center" bgcolor="#ffcccc"
| 62
| March 10, 1990
| @ Chicago
| L 105–117
|
|
|
| Chicago Stadium
| 31–31
|- align="center" bgcolor="#ffcccc"
| 63
| March 13, 1990
| San Antonio
| L 102–103
|
|
|
| Market Square Arena
| 31–32
|- align="center" bgcolor="#ffcccc"
| 64
| March 16, 1990
| Atlanta
| L 104–106 (OT)
|
|
|
| Market Square Arena
| 31–33
|- align="center" bgcolor="#ffcccc"
| 65
| March 17, 1990
| @ Cleveland
| L 102–118
|
|
|
| Richfield Coliseum
| 31–34
|- align="center" bgcolor="#ccffcc"
| 66
| March 20, 1990
| @ Miami
| W 112–98
|
|
|
| Miami Arena
| 32–34
|- align="center" bgcolor="#ccffcc"
| 67
| March 21, 1990
| Milwaukee
| W 112–96
|
|
|
| Market Square Arena
| 33–34
|- align="center" bgcolor="#ccffcc"
| 68
| March 23, 1990
| New Jersey
| W 125–109
|
|
|
| Market Square Arena
| 34–34
|- align="center" bgcolor="#ccffcc"
| 69
| March 27, 1990
| Boston
| W 101–96
|
|
|
| Market Square Arena
| 35–34
|- align="center" bgcolor="#ccffcc"
| 70
| March 29, 1990
| Sacramento
| W 111–101
|
|
|
| Market Square Arena
| 36–34

|- align="center" bgcolor="#ffcccc"
| 71
| April 1, 1990
| @ Cleveland
| L 91–121
|
|
|
| Richfield Coliseum
| 36–35
|- align="center" bgcolor="#ffcccc"
| 72
| April 3, 1990
| @ Chicago
| L 102–109
|
|
|
| Chicago Stadium
| 36–36
|- align="center" bgcolor="#ffcccc"
| 73
| April 4, 1990
| @ Milwaukee
| L 116–121 (OT)
|
|
|
| Bradley Center
| 36–37
|- align="center" bgcolor="#ccffcc"
| 74
| April 6, 1990
| @ Orlando
| W 123–115
|
|
|
| Orlando Arena
| 37–37
|- align="center" bgcolor="#ccffcc"
| 75
| April 8, 1990
| New York
| W 99–97
|
|
|
| Market Square Arena
| 38–37
|- align="center" bgcolor="#ccffcc"
| 76
| April 10, 1990
| Washington
| W 107–105
|
|
|
| Market Square Arena
| 39–37
|- align="center" bgcolor="#ffcccc"
| 77
| April 12, 1990
| @ New York
| L 100–108
|
|
|
| Madison Square Garden
| 39–38
|- align="center" bgcolor="#ccffcc"
| 78
| April 14, 1990
| @ New Jersey
| W 124–113
|
|
|
| Brendan Byrne Arena
| 40–38
|- align="center" bgcolor="#ccffcc"
| 79
| April 16, 1990
| Chicago
| W 111–102
|
|
|
| Market Square Arena
| 41–38
|- align="center" bgcolor="#ffcccc"
| 80
| April 18, 1990
| @ Philadelphia
| L 113–124
|
|
|
| The Spectrum
| 41–39
|- align="center" bgcolor="#ffcccc"
| 81
| April 20, 1990
| Detroit
| L 115–121 (OT)
|
|
|
| Market Square Arena
| 41–40
|- align="center" bgcolor="#ccffcc"
| 82
| April 22, 1990
| @ Washington
| W 127–117
|
|
|
| Capital Centre
| 42–40

Playoffs

|- align="center" bgcolor="#ffcccc"
| 1
| April 26, 1990
| @ Detroit
| L 92–104
| Detlef Schrempf (26)
| Detlef Schrempf (7)
| Vern Fleming (8)
| The Palace of Auburn Hills21,454
| 0–1
|- align="center" bgcolor="#ffcccc"
| 2
| April 28, 1990
| @ Detroit
| L 87–100
| Reggie Miller (23)
| Chuck Person (12)
| Vern Fleming (7)
| The Palace of Auburn Hills21,454
| 0–2
|- align="center" bgcolor="#ffcccc"
| 3
| May 1, 1990
| Detroit
| L 96–108
| Reggie Miller (22)
| LaSalle Thompson (8)
| Reggie Miller (4)
| Market Square Arena15,301
| 0–3
|-

Player statistics

Season

Playoffs

Player Statistics Citation:

Awards and records
 Reggie Miller, NBA All-Star Game

Transactions

References

See also
 1989-90 NBA season

Indiana Pacers seasons
1989 in sports in Indiana
Pace
Indiana